This is a list of notable schools in Kenya.

Primary schools
Primary schools in Kenya may be designated as follows:
  DEB indicating that they were founded by the now abolished District Education Boards, hence were public schools from the start.
 RC indicating that they were founded and sponsored by the Roman Catholic Church as it was known then
 AC indicating that they were founded and sponsored initially by the Anglican Church
 Others may have no designation meaning they were founded well after independence or they have dropped their sponsor designation from their official name.

Kiambu
 The Green Garden Schools
 Kiambu High School
 kiambu township primary
Kijabe Boys High School
 Ack st. James academy
 Kamonjoni Primary
 Kanjeru Primary
 Wangige Primary

Migori
 St. Joseph's Rapogi Secondary School
 kadika primary school

Mombasa
 Jaffery Academy Mombasa
 Mombasa Academy
 Oshwal Academy
 Swaminarayan Academy
 Greenwood Groove Academy
 Aga Khan Academy

Murang'a
 Murang'a High School

Nairobi County
 Holmeside School, Karen
The Green Garden Schools , Rongai
 Humble Hearts School
 Malezi School
 Olympic Primary School, Kibera
 Rosslyn Academy, Nairobi
 Serare School
 Strathmore School, Lavington
St Agnes learning center, kasarani

Nakuru
 Mountain Park Academy

Siaya
 Gongo Primary School, Central Gem ward

Secondary and high schools

International schools in Kenya
 Banda School, Nairobi
Brookhouse School, Nairobi
 Greensteds School, Nakuru
 Hillcrest School, Nairobi
 International School of Kenya, Nairobi
 Nairobi Academy
 Nairobi Japanese School
 Rift Valley Academy, Kijabe
 Rosslyn Academy, Nairobi
 St. Andrews School, Turi, near Nakuru
 SABIS International School, Runda, Kenya
 Crawford International School, Kenya
 Kitengela International Schools - KISC, Kenya
 Light International School, Kenya
 Zuwena International School, Kenya
 Jawabu School, Nairobi
 Brookhurst International School, Nairobi
 Braeside School , Nairobi
 Mahanaim International High School , Nairobi
 Kilimani international School , Nairobi
 Emerald International School , Nairobi
 Peponi School, Nairobi
 JENGA School, Nairobi
Mpesa foundation academy, Kiambu
 Kivukoni School, Kilifi County
 St.Josephs Girls secondary school,
  kibwezi East,
  makueni County
  Eastern province
 St.Marys Girls secondary school,
  Kinyambu,
  Makueni County,
  Eastern province
 Moi Girls secondary, 
  Kibwezi West,
  Makueni County,
  Eastern province,
 Makueni Boys secondary school
  Wote
  Makueni County
  Eastern province
Oaks Academy - Nairobi and Eldoret

References 

international Schools in Kenya
Makueni County schools
Machakos County schools

External links
 Directory of Schools in Kenya - Over 33,000 school listings (nursery, primary, secondary, colleges, universities, local and international schools in Kenya)
 Kenya Schools Directory - The most comprehensive listing of all schools in Kenya
 Education Website
 Complete Kenya School Directory (11,183 schools listed)
  Kenyan Education Websites
 Kenya Education Directory
  Top Schools in Kenya
 Kenya Education magazine with directory of schools
 Information on Education and Schools in Kenya
 Directory of the Teaching of French in Kenya
 Kenya Association of Teachers of French
 Kenya Education Guide

Schools
Schools
Schools
Kenya
Kenya